Bhutan participated at the 2017 Summer Universiade in Taipei, Taiwan with 7 competitors in 2 sports.

Competitors 
The following table lists Bhutan's delegation per sport and gender.

Badminton

Men

Women

Mixed

Table tennis

Men

Women

References 

Nations at the 2017 Summer Universiade
2017 in Bhutanese sport